

Films

References

Films
2016
2016-related lists